Franco Anderlini (17 August 1921  – 18 January 1984) was an Italian volleyball coach. He is one of the most successful ones having won eight Italian league titles.

Career
In 1947 Anderlini founded the Unione Sportiva Ferrari volleyball team, reaching Serie A in 1951. The following year the club was merged with the Avia Pervia Modena and Anderlini was confirmed as head coach. Between 1957 and 1963 he led the team to five Italian league titles. The Avia Pervia was disbanded after the 1964 season, so Anderlini switched to the G.S. Menegola and then to the newborn Panini Modena team. It took only two season to achieve Serie A and afterwards Anderlini lead Panini to three Italian league titles.

Between 1968 and 1983 he was head coach of Italy men's national juniores team; in 1975 he was also named coach of Italy men's national team.

Anderlini died in 1984 in a car accident.

1921 births
Sportspeople from Modena
Italian volleyball coaches
Volleyball coaches of international teams
1984 deaths